The A432 autoroute is a motorway in Lyon, France.  It connects the A46 with the A42 and A43 serving the airport Lyon Saint-Exupéry.

With the northern segment of the A46 it allows the traffic Paris - Marseilles, Côte d'Azur to avoid Lyon.

Junctions

Exchange A42-A432 Junction with the A42

03  10 km: Aéroport Lyon Saint-Exupéry Towns served: Pusignan, Villette d'Anthon, Janneyrias, Meyzieu
04 19 km Towns served: Saint-Bonnet-de-Mure, Colombier-Saugnieu
05 21 km Towns served: Saint-Laurent-de-Mure, Colombier-Saugnieu

Exchange A43-A432 Junction with the A43.

References

External links
 A432 Motorway in Saratlas

A432
Ring roads in France